Roberto "Róber" Suárez Pier (born 16 February 1995) is a Spanish professional footballer who plays as a centre-back for Levante UD.

Club career

Deportivo
Born in Oleiros, Galicia, Pier was a youth product of Deportivo de La Coruña. He made his debut as a senior with their reserves in 2012, spending several years with the side in Tercera División.

Pier made his competitive debut for the first team on 2 December 2015, starting in a 2–1 away win against UE Llagostera in the round of 32 of the Copa del Rey. His first match in La Liga took place on 12 March 2016, when he came on as a second-half substitute for Álex Bergantiños in a 3–0 away loss to Atlético Madrid.

Levante
On 6 July 2016, Pier was loaned to Segunda División club Levante UD for one year. He scored his first professional goal the following 13 May, his team's second in the 2–1 home victory over Girona FC.

On 2 August 2017, after achieving top-tier promotion as champions, Pier renewed with Deportivo until 2020 and immediately returned to Levante on a one-year loan deal. The following 7 July, the move was extended for a further season.

Pier signed a permanent four-year contract at the Estadi Ciutat de València on 2 September 2019.

Honours
Levante
Segunda División: 2016–17

References

External links

1995 births
Living people
People from A Coruña (comarca)
Sportspeople from the Province of A Coruña
Spanish footballers
Footballers from Galicia (Spain)
Association football defenders
La Liga players
Segunda División players
Tercera División players
Deportivo Fabril players
Deportivo de La Coruña players
Levante UD footballers